Law of the air may refer to:
 Aviation law and modern laws applying to airspace
 Cuius est solum eius est usque ad coelum et ad inferos, a medieval property law